The 1976 Western Kentucky football team represented Western Kentucky University during the 1976 NCAA Division II football season. Led by ninth-year head coach Jimmy Feix, the Hilltoppers compiled an overall record of 4–5–1 with a mark of 3–4 in conference play, tying for fourth place in the OVC. The team's captain was David Carter.

Schedule

References

Western Kentucky
Western Kentucky Hilltoppers football seasons
Western Kentucky Hilltoppers football